Palestinian National Liberation Front (in Arabic: جبهة التحرير الوطني الفلسطيني) was a Palestinian political and military organization, based amongst Palestinian refugees in Syria. The group existed 1968-1972. The group was led by Hassan Sabarini (Abohelmi), a Palestinian National Council member.

When the group disintegrated, most of its cadres joined Fatah.

Sources
al-watan data report

Defunct Palestinian militant groups
Defunct Palestinian political parties